Zovaber is a village in the Sevan Municipality of the Gegharkunik Province of Armenia.

Toponymy 
The village was previously known as Yaydzhi or Yayji.

History 
The village was founded in 1830 by emigrants from Maku. The village has a church of St. Stepanos, built in 1860.

Gallery

References

External links 

 
 

Populated places in Gegharkunik Province